Ponesimod, sold under the brand name Ponvory, is a medication for the treatment of multiple sclerosis. It is a sphingosine 1-phosphate receptor modulator.

The most common side effects include upper respiratory tract infection, hepatic transaminase elevation, and hypertension.

Ponesimod was approved for medical use in the United States in March 2021 and in the European Union in June 2021.

Medical uses 
Ponesimod is indicated for the treatment of relapsing forms of multiple sclerosis.

Adverse effects
Common adverse effects in studies were temporary bradycardia (slow heartbeat), usually at the beginning of the treatment, dyspnoea (breathing difficulties), and increased liver enzymes (without symptoms). No significant increase of infections was observed under ponesimod therapy. QT prolongation is detectable but was considered to be too low to be of clinical importance in a study.

Mechanism of action
Like fingolimod, which is already approved for the treatment of multiple sclerosis, ponesimod blocks the sphingosine-1-phosphate receptor. This mechanism prevents lymphocytes (a type of white blood cells) from leaving lymph nodes. Ponesimod is selective for subtype 1 of this receptor, S1P1.

History

Clinical trials 
In a 2009–2011 Phase II clinical trial including 464 multiple sclerosis patients, ponesimod treatment resulted in fewer new active brain lesions than placebo, measured during the course of 24 weeks.

In a 2010–2012 Phase II clinical trial including 326 patients with psoriasis, 46 or 48% of patients (depending on dosage) had a reduction of at least 75% Psoriasis Area and Severity Index (PASI) score compared to placebo in 16 weeks. The approval is already applied for in 2020.

In a 2015–2019 Phase III randomised, double-blind clinical trial of 1133 adult patients with relapsing multiple sclerosis, those under ponesimod treatment showed a 30% reduction in annual relapse rate and a significantly reduced number of new inflammatory lesions on brain MRI by 56% compared to those taking teriflunomide.

Society and culture

Legal status 
On 25 March 2021, the Committee for Medicinal Products for Human Use (CHMP) of the European Medicines Agency (EMA) adopted a positive opinion, recommending the granting of a marketing authorisation for the medicinal product Ponvory, intended for the treatment of active relapsing forms of multiple sclerosis. The applicant for this medicinal product is Janssen-Cilag International N.V. Ponesimod was approved for medical use in the European Union in May 2021.

References

External links 
 

Immunosuppressants
Multiple sclerosis
Thiazolidines
2-Tolyl compounds
Propyl compounds